Tragopogon orientalis, common name Oriental goat's beard,  is a hemicryptophyte herbaceous annual plant in the family Asteraceae.

Taxonomy
This species was previously treated as a subspecies of Tragopogon pratensis, in contrast with latter molecular phylogenetic analyses.

Distribution

This species is native to Eurasia, with a range from Europe to Siberia and Western Himalaya. It is present in most of Europe and in North America.

Description
The yellow flowers  have a diameter of about 5–8 cm. Fruits are 15–20 mm long. Leaves are rather broad. These plants are characterized by the enlarged stem under the capitula and by the flowers that have the same size as the perianth.

Biology
Flowering time lasts from May to September. This plant mainly grows in lowlands, hills, foothills and mountains.

External links
 Acta Plantarum
 Botanicka Fotogalerie
 PLADIAS

References

orientalis